Lucy Sketch (commonly known as Sketch) is a fictional character in British teen drama series Skins. She is portrayed by Aimee-Ffion Edwards.

Sketch appears in only 6 episodes, which is the least for any lead character in the history of the show.

Characterization
Sketch is portrayed as an obsessive and somewhat delusional Welsh girl. When officially first introduced in Sketch, she is seen to have a huge, bordering on pathological, infatuation with Maxxie Oliver, a boy with whom she goes to school. It is unclear when or how her infatuation developed, but several factors which can lead to obsessive love seem to have been experienced by Sketch. She harbors some rage towards her mother, Sheila, who she feels has never looked after her properly due to her suffering from multiple sclerosis. On top of this, she seems quite distant from a lot of her peers and most likely has feelings of unworthiness or low self-esteem. She sees Maxxie as someone who can make her life much better, and is so 'in love' with him that she pretends to her mother that they're boyfriend and girlfriend. She also wears male clothing and flattens her chest with a sash to appeal to Maxxie, who is gay. She displays manipulative and deceitful behavior showing little regard for anyone she hurts in her delusional quest to become Maxxie's girlfriend. As her story progresses, she later shows some regret for how she acted, though continues to be besotted with Maxxie, and even enters into a relationship with Maxxie's friend Anwar Kharral, in hopes to stay close to him. Although her first name is Lucy, the episode title and all of her peers refer to her by her last name, Sketch.

Character history

Series 2
Introduced in the second episode of series 2, Sketch is shown to be a pathologically obsessed stalker of Maxxie Oliver's and dreams of becoming his girlfriend, even though she is well aware that he is gay. She works on the lighting for a play directed by Mr. Gelpart, the school drama teacher. After she sees Michelle kissing Maxxie as part of her role, she drops a light from the rafters, surprising even herself. Later, Sketch attends a house party held by Mr. Gelpart where she pleads with him to give her Michelle's part. After he refuses the part, saying she was too unattractive to act, she tells the headteacher of the school that he kissed and rubbed her, resulting in Mr. Gelpart being fired. That same evening, Maxxie asked if she is single, and becomes distraught when she realizes he is asking for his friend, Anwar. She escapes to a cupboard and hides underneath a table. Michelle and Tony walk in, and she accidentally witnesses Tony turn down Michelle. After he leaves, Sketch offers her a beer, and they bond over their disdain for men.

After leaving the party, she breaks into Maxxie's home by picking the lock with her hair clip. She proceeds to put on his clothing and masturbate on his bed. Maxxie then arrives back home from the party, and Sketch stays the night underneath his bed. The next morning Maxxie finds a red hair clip on the floor in his bedroom. He later sees Sketch wearing the same hair clip, and realizes that Sketch is his stalker. After seeing another picture taken of him, he calls at her flat, and he discovers that Sketch has made out to her mother that Maxxie is her boyfriend. Her mother discovers the truth about her infatuation and realizes she lied about Mr. Gelpart as well. When she threatens to reveal this, Sketch, in panic and desperation, ties her mother to her bed.

Finally, she steals Michelle's main role in the school play (Osama: The Musical) by giving her emetics, which she got from her mother. Maxxie confronts her and she confesses her love for him. He frustratedly tells her he is gay. She places his hand on her breast and tells him she's "as close to a boy as you can get", and that after they kiss he will see. At the moment of their kiss, Maxxie whispers to her that he 'felt nothing' and that she disgusts him. She proceeds to slap him on stage, and Maxxie yells at her and walks off. The play abruptly ends to an awkward and confused audience. She goes home, after removing her sash and putting on a low-cut dress, proceeds to Anwar's house. He tells her that Maxxie told him about how she'd stalked him, and she convinced him he was delusional and claimed to have fancied Anwar all along. She goes up to his room to have sex with him, whilst concentrating on a photograph of Maxxie, showing her obsession is not yet resolved. She breaks the fourth wall by looking directly at the camera, at the very end of her centric episode, she, Effy and Rich are the only characters in Skins to do so.

She makes an appearance in Sid, where she is shown to be continuing her sexual relationship with Anwar, even going as far as having sex with him in Sid Jenkins's bed. Sketch states in Anwar and Sketch's date that she still loves Maxxie (even though she does state that she is rethinking her actions and seeking redemption), however her attempts at dumping Anwar are stifled when he calls her his girlfriend, to get rid of an overbearing waiter.

In Michelle, Sketch crashes Michelle's birthday camping trip. She is caught having sex with Anwar by Michelle and Maxxie, who are both outraged that Anwar is now in a relationship with her, considering her past history. Sketch apologises for what she has done, tells Maxxie that she is over him, and that she now likes Anwar. Later over the campfire, she sings If You're Not The One with Scarlett. She stares at Maxxie intensely as she sings, obviously still infatuated with him.

At Chris Miles's house party in Chris, Sketch once again meets Maxxie. The two still have a very hostile relationship even though she insists she is over him. Her relationship with Anwar continues, but she has persuaded him into dressing in a style exactly like Maxxie's with a matching hairstyle as well. When Maxxie forces Anwar to realise this, he dumps Sketch on the spot.

In the last episode of Skins's second series, Sketch tries to convince the emotional and isolated Anwar that he perhaps has no future with his friends—that they will move on without him. We learn that after school she plans on remaining at home to take care of her mother, where she further explains that nothing is wrong with that kind of life style to ease Anwar's doubts. She seems to have accepted that she and Anwar should be together, as the ones left behind. Eventually Anwar is invited to share a flat with Maxxie in London, where he leaves a distraught Sketch behind.

Post-Series 2
In the fourth Skins Short, which was made alongside series 4, Thomas and JJ are applying for a job at the cinema, where JJ is seen wearing Maxxie's and later Sketch's costumes at the fancy-dress party in her central episode.

References

External links
 Sketch on the official E4 Skins site
 Sketch on Myspace

Skins (British TV series) characters
Television characters introduced in 2008
Fictional Welsh people
Fictional stalkers
Female characters in television
British female characters in television
Teenage characters in television